Future technology-related topics include:

 Emerging technologies, technologies that are perceived as capable of changing the status quo
 Hypothetical technology, technology that does not exist yet, but that could exist in the future
 Futures studies (also called futurology), the study of postulating possible, probable, and preferable futures and the worldviews and myths that underlie them
 Technology forecasting, attempts to predict the future characteristics of useful technological machines, procedures or techniques